Francisco Waldir Pires de Souza (21 October 1926 – 22 June 2018) was a Brazilian politician. He served as the Minister of Defence under President Luiz Inácio Lula da Silva, before being fired for gross incompetence and inaction during Brazil's aviation crisis of 2006–2007. At the time of the crisis, he was accused by some in Brazil of nearing senility. He was replaced by former Supreme Court President Nelson Jobim. He presided over the Brazilian Mission to Haiti.

References

1926 births
2018 deaths
Governors of Bahia
Defence ministers of Brazil

Candidates for Vice President of Brazil